Zdeněk Pospěch (born 14 December 1978) is a Czech former professional footballer. He normally played as a defender in a right back position, but could also play on the right side of midfield.

Club career
Pospěch started his professional career in SFC Opava. After two loan-out deals to FK Dukla Hranice and Fotbal Třinec he moved to FC Baník Ostrava in 2001. After four years in Ostrava, he moved on to Sparta Prague. In 2005, he made his national team debut in a friendly match against Sweden.

On 23 January 2008, his €1.9 million move to Danish F.C. Copenhagen were announced. Here he joined his friend Libor Sionko.

In the 2010–11 UEFA Champions League, Pospěch was named in UEFA's "Team of the week".

He signed for Bundesliga side 1. FSV Mainz 05 on a two-year-contract on 28 February 2011 and joined after the 2010–11 season when his contract with Copenhagen expired.

In July 2014 he returned to SFC Opava which played in the Czech second division and where he started with professional football.

International career
On 17 August 2005, Pospech made his debut in the senior team of the Czech Republic, as he played one half of the match in a 1–2 defeat against Sweden. In October 2007, he made his third appearances for the national team starting in a 3–0 win at the Allianz Arena against Germany in qualifying for Euro 2008. With the win against the already qualified German team, the Czech Republic had also qualified to compete in the European Championships and won the championship lead, which no longer blazes the team until the end of the qualification, which was synonymous with the group winners. In May 2008 Pospech was nominated together with Libor Sionko (also standing at this time F.C. Copenhagen under contract) in the squad for Euro 2008. However, he came in this tournament to no use.

In the qualifying matches for the 2010 World Cup he played seven times scoring one goal, while the team failed to qualify for the World Cup.

To March 2011 Pospech before played in all games in qualifying for Euro 2012, before then in August of that year with the Czech team in a friendly match in Oslo against Norway 0–3 loss, but the team is one of the worst performances showed in recent years. He was then replaced by Theodor Gebre Selassie from the starting line and Pospech played only four times in the remaining six games in the 2011 calendar year. On 15 November 2011, Pospech played for the last time for the senior team of the Czech Republic, as he came on the pitch in the second leg of the European Championship qualification Barrage against Montenegro.

Honours
 Gambrinus liga: 2003–04, 2006–07
 Czech Cup: 2004–05, 2005–06, 2006–07, 2007–08
 Danish Superliga: 2008–09, 2009–10, 2010–11
 Danish Cup: 2008–09

References

External links
 
 
 
 

1978 births
Living people
Sportspeople from Opava
Czech footballers
Czech Republic international footballers
Association football defenders
Czech First League players
SFC Opava players
FC Baník Ostrava players
AC Sparta Prague players
F.C. Copenhagen players
Danish Superliga players
1. FSV Mainz 05 players
Bundesliga players
UEFA Euro 2008 players
Czech expatriate footballers
Expatriate men's footballers in Denmark
Expatriate footballers in Germany